The Moldova national football team represents Moldova in association football and is controlled by the Federația Moldovenească de Fotbal (FMF), the governing body of the sport in the country. It competes as a member of the Union of European Football Associations (UEFA), which encompasses the countries of Europe.

The team's largest victory came on 18 August 1992 when they defeated Pakistan by five goals to nil. Their worst loss is 8–0 against Denmark in 2021. Alexandru Epureanu holds the appearance record for Moldova, having been capped 91 times since his first match in 2006. The goalscoring record is held by Serghei Cleșcenco, who scored eleven times in 69 matches. As of July 2019, Moldova are ranked 171st in the FIFA World Rankings. Its highest ever ranking of 37th was achieved in April 2008.

Moldova's first match of the 2010s was a 1–0 victory against Kazakhstan in a friendly. The team completed four qualification campaigns between 2010 and 2019, for UEFA Euro 2012, 2014 FIFA World Cup, UEFA Euro 2016 and 2018 FIFA World Cup; they failed to qualify in each. Between 2010 and 2019, the team played 93 matches and their record is 16 wins, 23 draws and 54 losses.

Matches

2010

2011

2012

2013

2014

2015

2016

2017

2018

2019

References
All details are sourced to the match reports cited, unless otherwise specified:

External links
Moldova - International Results 1991 to 2008
Reports for all matches of Moldova national team

Moldova national football team results
2010s in Moldovan sport